Hyon Ni Airport is an airport near Hyŏl-li in Hoeyang-gun, Kangwon-do, North Korea. located 17 km southwest of Hoeyang-up.

Facilities 
The airfield has a single concrete runway 02/20 measuring 8870 x 154 feet (2704 x 47 m).

References 

Airports in North Korea
Kangwon Province (North Korea)